The 25th Utah Senate District is located in Cache and Rich Counties and includes Utah House Districts 2, 3, 4, 5, and 53. The current State Senator representing the 25th district is Chris H. Wilson. Wilson was elected to the Utah Senate in 2020 and assumed office on January 1, 2021. His predecessor Lyle W. Hillyard was first elected in 1984.

Previous Utah State Senators (District 25)

Election results

2004 General Election

2020 General Election

See also

 Lyle W. Hillyard
 Utah Democratic Party
 Utah Republican Party
 Utah Senate

References

External links
 Utah Senate District Profiles
 Official Biography of Lyle W. Hillyard

25
Cache County, Utah
Rich County, Utah